was a Japanese professional motorcycle racer. He competed in Grand Prix motorcycle racing as a wildcard entrant in three Japanese Grand Prix (& ). He died on Sunday April 24, 2011 following a road traffic accident in Saitama, Japan. He was the younger brother of former Moto2 race winner, Yuki Takahashi.

Career statistics

Grand Prix motorcycle racing

By season

Races by year
(key)

References

External links

1987 births
2011 deaths
Sportspeople from Saitama (city)
Japanese motorcycle racers
250cc World Championship riders
Moto2 World Championship riders
Road incident deaths in Japan